The smc Pentax D FA 645 55mm F2.8 AL (IF) SDM AW is an interchangeable camera lens by Pentax.

References
http://www.dpreview.com/products/pentax/lenses/pentax_55_2p8_645/specifications

055